

October
 October 5:
The German government moves to back troubled Hypo Real Estate with a 50 billion euro rescue plan. (MarketWatch)
German Chancellor Angela Merkel announces that Germany will explicitly guarantee the deposits in banks held by its citizens. (MarketWatch)
 October 9: Iceland nationalises Kaupthing Bank.
 October 9: IMF: World on brink of recession; prepares special loan program.
 October 9: Markets down across the world; Dow Jones falls below 9,000.
 October 10: Hampshire councils have £3 million invested in Icelandic banks.
 October 10: Dow Jones recovers hundreds of points, before losing them in minutes.
 October 10: Global markets plunge.
 October 10: WTO calls meeting on trade finance and economic crisis.
 October 11: G7 says "all available tools" will be used to solve crisis.
 October 11: Iceland and United Kingdom in diplomatic dispute over financial crisis.
 October 11: George W. Bush attempts to reassure Americans in radio address.

References